Syngenta AG is a provider of agricultural science and technology, in particular seeds and pesticides with its management headquarters in Basel, Switzerland. It is owned by ChemChina, a Chinese state-owned enterprise.

Syngenta was founded in 2000 by the merger of the agrichemical businesses of Novartis and AstraZeneca, and acquired by China National Chemical Corporation (ChemChina) in 2017. Its business units are Syngenta Crop Protection, Syngenta Seeds, Adama, and Syngenta Group China. In 2020, the Syngenta Group was formed, bringing together Syngenta, Adama, and the agricultural business of Sinochem under a single entity. 

Syngenta's primary products include pesticides, selective herbicides, non-selective herbicides, fungicides, insecticides, as well as corn, soya, and biofuel. Syngenta brands include Actara (Thiamethoxam), Agrisure (corn with Viptera trait), Alto (Cyproconazole), Amistar (azoxystrobin), Avicta, Axial, Bicep II, Bravo, Callisto, Celest, Cruiser (TMX, Thiamethoxam), Dividend, Dual, Durivo, Elatus, Fusilade, Force, Golden Harvest, Gramoxone, Karate, Northrup-King (NK), Proclaim, Revus, Ridomil, Rogers, Score, Seguris, S&G, Tilt, Topik, Touchdown, Vertimec and Vibrance.

The 2011 Dow Jones Sustainability Index, named Syngenta one of the best performing chemical companies worldwide. However, the company has been controversial, mainly due to its main business – selling toxic chemicals and the environmental impact of those chemicals – but also due to its investment in lobbying. In 2012, the company was nominated for the Public Eye Award, which denounces companies with questionable human rights practices.

History
Based in Basel, Switzerland, Syngenta was formed in 13 November 2000 by the merger of Novartis Agribusiness and Zeneca Agrochemicals.

In 2004, Syngenta Seeds purchased Garst, the North American corn and soybean business of Advanta, as well as Golden Harvest Seeds.

, Syngenta's main competitors were Monsanto Company, BASF, Dow AgroSciences, Bayer CropScience and DuPont Pioneer.

In 2014, Monsanto sought to acquire Syngenta for a reported $40 billion, but Syngenta rejected the offer. Since April 2015, Monsanto and Syngenta had been working with their investment banks Morgan Stanley and Goldman Sachs respectively on a deal. The U.S. Treasury tried to stop the deal for tax inversion. Syngenta's Board of Directors rejected an even better offer by Monsanto during August 2015, and Monsanto withdrew from the negotiations on 26 August.

In February 2016, ChemChina, a Chinese state-owned enterprise, offered to purchase Syngenta for $43 billion (480 Swiss francs per share), a deal which the company "unanimously recommended to shareholders".  In April 2017, the Federal Trade Commission, the Committee on Foreign Investment in the United States, and the European Commissioner for Competition approved of the acquisition. This was largest takeover by a Chinese company to date, and it caused criticism. To secure approval, ChemChina agreed to divest from pesticide production of paraquat, abamectin, and chlorothalonil. The transaction closed on 26 June 2017.

In November 2017, Syngenta agreed to purchase Nidera from Cofco International.

In March 2018, Syngenta announced plans to acquire Strider, a Brazilian agtech company. In July, Syngenta acquired Floranova, a flower and vegetable seeds breeder based in the UK.

In September 2019, the company acquired all the assets of The Cropio Group, an agri-technology company.

In June 2020, ChemChina transferred its entire agricultural business to the Syngenta Group, which now also includes Adama and the agricultural activities of Sinochem in addition to Syngenta. The Syngenta Group is a Chinese company with its management headquarters in Basel, Switzerland.

Acquisition history (selection)

The following is an illustration of the company's mergers, acquisitions, spin-offs and historical predecessors:

Products and services

Syngenta has eight primary product lines which it develops, markets and sells worldwide;
Its five product lines for pesticides are selective herbicides, non-selective herbicides, fungicides, insecticides and seed care. 
Three product lines for seed products include corn and soya, other field crops and vegetables. In 2014, sales from crop protection products accounted for US $11.381 billion, i.e. 75% of total sales. Field crop seeds include both hybrid seeds and genetically engineered seeds, some of which enter the food chain and become part of genetically modified food. According to Syngenta, in the US their "proprietary triple stack corn seeds expanded to represent around 25 percent of units sold."  In 2010, the US EPA approved insecticidal trait stacks including Syngenta's AGRISURE VIPTERA™ gene, which offers resistance to certain corn pests. Syngenta cross-licenses its proprietary genes with Dow AgroSciences and thus is able to include Dow's Herculex I and Herculex RW insect resistance traits in its seeds. It sells a VMAX soybean that is resistant to glyphosate herbicide.

Syngenta brands include Actara (Thiamethoxam), Agrisure (corn with Viptera trait), Alto (Cyproconazole), Amistar (azoxystrobin), Avicta, Axial, Bicep II, Bravo, Callisto, Celest, Cruiser (TMX, Thiamethoxam), Dividend, Dual, Durivo, Elatus, Fusilade, Force, Golden Harvest, Gramoxone, Karate, Northrup-King (NK), Proclaim, Revus, Ridomil, Rogers, Score, Seguris, S&G, Tilt, Topik, Touchdown, Vertimec and Vibrance.
In 2007, Queensland University in Australia contracted with Syngenta to research different inputs for biofuels as a renewable energy source.

Former products
Syngenta's predecessor, Ciba-Geigy, introduced the insecticide Galecron chlordimeform in 1966, and it was removed from the market in 1988.  In 1976, Ciba-Geigy told regulatory authorities that it was temporarily withdrawing chlordimeform because ongoing long-term toxicology studies - particularly studies to determine if long-term exposure could cause cancer - showed that it was causing cancer and that it has already started to monitor its workers' exposure and had found chlordimeform and its metabolites in the urine of its workers.
Ciba-Geigy then applied for and was granted, permission to market Galecron at lower doses for use only on cotton.  However, as further long-term monitoring data was obtained, regulators banned chlordimeform in 1988.  In 1995, class action in the US, Ciba-Geigy agreed to cover costs for employee health monitoring and treatment. In 2005, Syngenta reported that employee health monitoring was continuing at the company's Monthey, Switzerland site.

Biofuels
Like many agriculture companies, Syngenta also works in the biofuel space. In 2011, it announced the corn trait Enogen to reduce the consumption of water and energy versus conventional corn. In 2007, Queensland University in Australia contracted with Syngenta to research different inputs for biofuels as a renewable energy source.

Other activities

Lobbying
Syngenta is in the transparency register of the European Union as a registered lobbyist. For 2017, it declared a €1.5 to €1.75 million expenditure of lobbying in European institutions.

Syngenta’s contributions to U.S. federal candidates, parties, and outside groups totaled $140,822 during the 2018 election cycle, ranking it 20th on the list of companies in its sector. Its lobbying expenditures in the U.S. during 2018 were $770,000, ranking it 7th in its sector.

Syngenta Foundation
In 2001, the company established the Syngenta Foundation for Sustainable Agriculture. Its purpose is to promote sustainable agriculture, for example by supporting relevant scientific input and analysis in this field. The Syngenta Foundation originated from the former Novartis Foundation. The goals of the Syngenta Foundation are "to work with rural communities in the semi-arid regions of the world and improve their livelihoods."

Awards and other recognition
In 2007, Syngenta’s Canadian division was named one of Canada’s Top 100 Employers, as published in Maclean’s magazine.

In October 2008, Syngenta Crop Protection Canada, Inc. was recognized as one of Waterloo Area’s Top Employers, as announced in the Waterloo Region Record, Guelph Mercury and Cambridge Times. In 2011, Syngenta was named among the top 10 employers in biotechnology by Science magazine. The 2011, Dow Jones Sustainability Index named Syngenta one of the best performing chemical companies worldwide. Syngenta was one of five chemical companies in the World and Europe indices based on economic, social and environmental performance.

Litigation
In 2001, the United States Patent and Trademark Office ruled in favor of Syngenta which had filed a suit against Bayer for patent infringement on a class of neonicotinoid insecticides. The following year Syngenta filed suits against Monsanto and other companies claiming infringement of its U.S. biotechnology patents covering genetically modified corn and cotton. In 2004, it again filed a suit against Monsanto, claiming antitrust violations related to the U.S. biotech corn seed market, and Monsanto countersued. Monsanto and Syngenta settled all litigation in 2008.

Syngenta was the defendant in a class action lawsuit by the city of Greenville, Illinois concerning the adverse effects of atrazine on human water supplies. The suit was settled for $105 million in May 2012. A similar case involving six states has been in federal court since 2010.

In the U.S., Syngenta is facing lawsuits from farmers and shipping companies regarding Viptera genetically modified corn. The plaintiffs in nearly 30 states contend that Syngenta’s introduction of Viptera drove down U.S. grain market prices, leading to financial harm, and that Syngenta acted irresponsibly by doing too little to enable shipping companies to export the grain to approved ports. Before Viptera’s 2010 introduction Syngenta secured all U.S. and NCGA-recommended export approvals, but none from China. China had imported little to no U.S. grain prior to 2010, and at the time was not considered a major partner, which changed in 2010, when it dramatically increased U.S. grain imports. For three years, China imported U.S. Viptera grain without formal approval. In November 2013, Chinese officials destroyed a U.S. grain shipment containing Viptera grain and began rejecting all U.S. shipments with the GM grain, but continued to accept it from all countries other than the U.S. The same year, U.S. corn market prices dropped $4 per bushel, causing over $2.9 billion in losses, with just over half of that loss occurring prior to China’s November rejection. China later approved the GM corn in 2014, but U.S. corn grain market prices have since not rebounded. Syngenta lost the first lawsuit to reach trial in Kansas on 23 June 2017, and was ordered to pay the farmers $217 million. However, Syngenta has stated it would appeal the verdict.

Controversies
In 2007, Syngenta came under scrutiny by the U.S. Securities and Exchange Commission. This was due to third-party sales of products in countries such as Iran, Cuba, North Korea, Sudan, and Syria.

In the past, Syngenta’s crop protection products have also been the subject of repeated criticism. The company was accused of including the sale of highly toxic pesticides in its business model. In 2012, the company was therefore nominated for the "Public Eye Award", which denounces companies with questionable human rights practices.

Brazil
On 21 October 2007, a Brazilian peasant organization, the Landless Workers' Movement, led a group of landless farmers in an invasion of one of the company’s seed research farms, in protest against genetically-engineered ("genetically modified") vegetables and in hopes of obtaining land for landless families to cultivate. After the invasion had begun, a team from NF Security arrived in a minibus and a fight with gunfire ensued. A trespasser and a security guard were killed, and some trespassers and other security guards were wounded.

The Brazilian police investigation, which concluded in November 2007, blamed the confrontation and death of the trespasser on nine employees and the owner of NF Security; the leader of MST was blamed for trespassing. The inquiry found that the invader was fatally shot in the abdomen and in the leg. The security guard was shot in the head. Eight others were injured, five of them invaders.

The Civil Court of Cascavel granted an order for the repossession of the site on 20 December 2007 and on 12 June 2008, the remaining MST members left the Santa Teresa site they had been occupying. On 14 October 2008, Syngenta donated the 123-hectare station to the Agronomy Institute of Paraná (IAPAR) for research into biodiversity, recovery of degraded areas and agriculture production systems, as well as environmental education programs.

In November 2015, Judge Pedro Ivo Moreiro, of the 1st Civil Court of Cascavel, ruled that Syngenta must pay compensation to the family of Valmir Mota de Oliveira ("Keno"), who was killed in the attack, and to Isabel Nascimento dos Santos who was injured. In his sentence the judge stated that "to refer to what happened as a confrontation is to close one’s eyes to reality, since […] there is no doubt that, in truth, it was a massacre disguised as repossession of property". The version of events put forward by Syngenta was rejected by the Court. In May 2010, Syngenta was condemned by the IV Permanent People’s Tribunal for human rights violations in Brazil.

Tyrone Hayes
There has been a long-running conflict between Syngenta and University of California at Berkeley biologist Tyrone Hayes.

According to an article in the 10 February 2014, issue of The New Yorker, Syngenta’s public-relations team took steps to discredit Hayes, whose research is purported to suggest that the Syngenta-produced chemical atrazine was responsible for abnormal development of reproductive organs in frogs. The article states that the company paid third-party critics to write articles discrediting Hayes’s work, planned to have his wife investigated, and planted hostile audience members at scientific talks given by Hayes.

During a 21 February 2014, interview conducted on Democracy Now, Hayes reiterated the claims. After the interview aired, Syngenta denied targeting Hayes or making any threats, calling those statements "uncorroborated and intentionally damaging" and demanding a retraction and public apology from Hayes and Democracy Now.

In 2010, Syngenta forwarded an ethics complaint to the University of California Berkeley, complaining that Hayes had been sending sexually explicit and harassing e-mails to Syngenta scientists. Legal counsel from the university responded that Hayes had acknowledged sending letters having "unprofessional and offensive" content, and that he had agreed not to use similar language in future communications.

References

External links

 

Companies formerly listed on the New York Stock Exchange
Companies formerly listed on the SIX Swiss Exchange
Agriculture companies of Switzerland
Biotechnology companies of Switzerland
Intensive farming
Chemical companies of Switzerland
Multinational companies headquartered in Switzerland
ChemChina
Novartis
AstraZeneca
Companies based in Basel
Biotechnology companies established in 2000
Swiss brands
2000 establishments in Switzerland
2017 mergers and acquisitions